The Ministry of National Defence (Portuguese: Ministério da Defesa Nacional) is a ministry of the Government of São Tomé and Príncipe. It is headed by the Minister of Defence and Internal Order (Portuguese: Ministro da Defesa e Ordem Interna). The current minister is Lieutenant colonel Jorge Amado.

References

Most sites are down

São Tomé and Príncipe
National Defence